Rear Admiral Mir Ershad Ali, OSP, NPP, ndc, psc, BN is a two-star admiral in Bangladesh Navy. He is the incumbent Chairman of Mongla Port Authority. Prior to this appointment, he was Commander of Bangladesh Navy Fleet. Before that he was appointed as Director of Naval Intelligence (DNI) at Naval Headquarters. He elevated to the Rear Admiral rank from Commodore on 25 January 2022.

Early life and education 
Ali joined Bangladesh Navy in January 1987 in executive branch. He successfully completed Naval Officers’ Basic Course from Germany and Gunnery Specialization Course from India. He is also a proud alumnus of the German Staff College (Führungsakademie der Bundeswehr), where he was adjudged to be the best officer of the course and was awarded the prestigious ‘Scharnhorst Award’. He completed his staff college course from DSCSC and NDC course from National Defence college and Mphil from Bangladesh University of Professionals.

Military career 
Ali served in the Naval Headquarters as Director of Naval Plans, Director of Personnel Services, Director of Naval Training, Director of Naval Operation, Director Multi-national Operations, Director Staff Duties and Ceremony and also as Secretary of the Indian Ocean Naval Symposium (IONS). As Commodore he commanded the western flotilla of Bangladesh Navy as the Commander Flotilla West (COMFLOT West). He also commanded BNS BANGABANDHU. He apoointed as the Chairman of Mongla Port Authority on January 2023.

Personal life 
Rear Admiral Ali married to Mrs Sharmin and the couple is blessed with 2 sons.

References 

Bangladeshi Navy admirals
Bangladesh Navy personnel
Bangladesh Navy
Living people
Year of birth missing (living people)